, subtitled , is a Swedish biobibliographical dictionary of Swedish-language authors published by Rabén & Sjögren between 1942 and 1981, covering the years 1900–1975 in seven parts in ten volumes.

The first two volumes (935 pages) are a biographical dictionary of Swedish-language (Swedish, Finnish-Swedish and Swedish-American) fiction writers who were active in 1900 to 1940. The aim was to include all authors who have published any work of fiction of at least 16 pages in length. The length of the articles varies from a few lines to 13 pages (August Strindberg). In addition to works of fiction, non-fiction (under the heading Varia) and translations are also listed. However, those who are strictly translators are not included. The third volume is an alphabetical index of book titles (427 pages) and author pseudonyms (20 pages) as well as the authors' place of residence in various regions (36 pages).

Similar biographical dictionaries 

 Eva Björling,  ('Dictionary of Swedish Children's Authors') (1977), covering 1960–1974 

References 

  1900–1940 (1942), forward. 
 Libris, bibliographic information.

External links 

 Svenskt författarlexikon at Projekt Runeberg 

Library science
History of literature
Swedish encyclopedias
Biographical dictionaries
20th-century encyclopedias
1942 non-fiction books